Gadsden High School in Gadsden, Alabama was closed after the 2005–2006 school year. It consolidated with Emma Sansom High School and Litchfield High School to form Gadsden City High School.

The school was involved in a historic case of racism against African American students in Alabama. Ten students including Jennie Patrick were discriminated against by both teachers and students after entering the school through people protesting about racial integration in schools.

Notable alumni
Derrick Allen, American basketball player
Hersh Freeman, Major League Baseball pitcher
Rex Keeling, professional football player
Mathew Knowles, music executive
Jennie Patrick, first African American woman in the United States to earn a doctorate in chemical engineering (MIT)
Aaron Pearson, American football player
Robert Bruce Propst, judge
Gary D. Speer, U.S. Army lieutenant general
Jerry Watford, American football player

References

Defunct schools in Alabama
Educational institutions disestablished in 2006